Microrhopala vittata, the goldenrod leaf miner, is a species of leaf beetle in the family Chrysomelidae. It is found in North America. Adults emerge in April. Females lay their eggs in clusters of two to four and cover them in frass.

References

Further reading

External links

 

Cassidinae
Articles created by Qbugbot
Beetles described in 1798